2020 in arthropod palentology is a list of new arthropod fossil taxa, including arachnids, crustaceans, insects, trilobites, and other arthropods that were announced or described, as well as other significant arthropod paleontological discoveries and events which occurred in 2020.

Arachnids

Newly named taxa

Crustaceans

Newly named taxa

Malacostracans

Ostracods

Other crustaceans

General research 
 Redescription and a study on the phylogenetic relationships of Francocaris grimmi, based on data from new fossil material from the Solnhofen Limestone (Germany), is published by Pazinato et al. (2020).
 A hermit crab belonging to the family Pylochelidae preserved in a shell of an ammonite belonging to the species Craspedites nekrassovi will be described from the Upper Jurassic of Moscow, Russia by Mironenko (2020).
 A putative lobster Tricarina gadvanensis from the Early Cretaceous of Iran is reinterpreted as a seroloid isopod by Hyžný et al. (2020).
 A study on the phylogenetic relationships of Eocarcinus praecursor is published by Scholtz (2020).
 A study on anatomical adaptations that enabled an ecological transition into the water column in Silurian myodocopes, focusing on myodocopids from the Herefordshire Lagerstätte (United Kingdom), is published by Siveter, Perrier & Williams (2020).
 A study comparing sexual dimorphism in ostracods from the Gulf and Atlantic coastal plain before and after the Cretaceous–Paleogene extinction event is published by Martins et al. (2020).
 Redescription of Americlus rankini and a study on the paleoecology of this taxon is published by Clark et al. (2020).

Insects

Trilobites

New taxa

General research
 A study on the timing of the trilobite extinctions at the early to middle Cambrian transition is published by Sundberg et al. (2020).
 Evidence of gregarious moulting of Cambrian (Stage 4) trilobites from the "Tsinghsutung" Formation (China), representing one of the earliest records of synchronized moulting behaviours in the fossil record, is presented by Corrales-García et al. (2020).
 A study on trilobite size variations in the Ordovician Fezouata Formation (Morocco) deposited in a cold-water environment is published by Saleh et al. (2020).
 A study on the nature of variation among oryctocephalid specimens from the Combined Metals Member of the Pioche Formation (Nevada; Cambrian Stage 4) will be published by Webster & Sundberg (2020).
 A study on the ontogeny of the olenid trilobite Leptoplastides salteri is published by Månsson & Clarkson (2020).
 A study on the anatomy of the internal structures of the compound eye of Aulacopleura koninckii is published by Schoenemann & Clarkson (2020).
 A study on exuviae of Ovalocephalus tetrasulcatus from the Ordovician Linhsiang Formation (Hubei, China) is published by Zong (2020), who reports exuviae arranged with two or three together end to end or superimposed, and evaluates the implications of these findings for the knowledge of the behavior of trilobites.

Other arthropods

Newly named taxa

General research
 Exceptionally preserved specimens of Chuandianella ovata carrying a large number of small eggs are described from the Cambrian Chengjiang biota (China) by Ou et al. (2020), who compare the reproductive strategies of C. ovata and closely related Waptia fieldensis.
 Sun, Zeng & Zhao (2020) report the discovery of a member of the genus Sidneyia belonging or related to the species S. inexpectans from the Wuliuan Mantou Formation of North China, expanding known distribution of this genus.
 A putative xiphosuran Kiaeria is reinterpreted as a member of Chasmataspidida by Lamsdell (2020a).
 A study on the anatomy of head structures of Heterocrania rhyniensis, evaluating its implications for the knowledge of the phylogenetic relationships of euthycarcinoids, is published by Edgecombe et al. (2020).
 A study on heterochrony in Xiphosura, showing that clades that occupy non-marine environments show elevated rates of peramorphosis or paedomorphosis is published by Lamsdell (2020b).
 A study on the morphology of the feeding apparatuses of Eurypterida and Trigonotarbida is published by Haug (2020).
 A study aiming to determine the range of prey sizes that could be captured by sweep-feeding eurypterids is published by Hughes & Lamsdell (2020).
 A study on the anatomy and phylogenetic relationships of Anhelkocephalon handlirschi is published by Schädel & Haug (2020), who interpret this taxon as a probable member of Cyclida rather than an isopod.
 Liu et al. (2020) report evidence of the presence of a three-dimensionally preserved labrum associated with the mouth opening in juvenile specimens of Leanchoilia illecebrosa.

References

2020 in paleontology
Arthropod paleontology